Asimov's Science Fiction is an American science fiction magazine which publishes science fiction and fantasy named after science fiction author Isaac Asimov. It is currently published by Penny Publications. From January 2017, the publication frequency is bimonthly (six issues per year).

Publication history 
In February 1976, Isaac Asimov visited the offices of Davis Publications to drop off a story he was submitting to Ellery Queen's Mystery Magazine.  Joel Davis, the publisher, had recently acquired Alfred Hitchcock's Mystery Magazine, and was interested in adding new fiction magazines to his list.  One of his employees had told him how much their children had enjoyed a Star Trek convention they'd attended, so Davis took the opportunity to talk to Asimov about a new science fiction (sf) title.  Davis wanted to use Asimov's name as part of the magazine's title.  Asimov was concerned about the potential impact on the two of the major sf magazines of the day, Analog Science Fiction/Science Fact, and The Magazine of Fantasy & Science Fiction (F&SF), both of which were edited by friends of his, Ben Bova and Ed Ferman.  Davis argued that a new magazine would be good for the field, and Bova and Ferman both told Asimov that they agreed with Davis.  Asimov agreed to go ahead with the plan on condition that he did not act as editor.  Asimov wrote a regular science column for F&SF, which he continued, but Davis asked him not to submit fiction to any other magazines.

George Scithers was soon hired to fill the editorial role, with Gardner Dozois as associate editor; Dozois only stayed a year, as he and Scithers did not agree on what kind of stories should be accepted.  Davis initially committed to three quarterly issues, the first of which was dated Spring 1977, and appeared on December 16, 1976.  It was immediately successful, with circulation of 108,843 for the first year, a little higher than Analog's.  Circulation was helped by the distribution network that Davis Publications already had access to for its existing magazines, with robust newsstand distribution and some existing readers who subscribed to Asimov's.  Paperback anthologies of stories from the magazine were assembled, starting at the end of 1977, these were profitable and also attracted new readers.  The magazine's success persuaded Davis to move to a bimonthly schedule for 1978, and to monthly starting with the January 1979 issue.  Davis also decided to launch a second magazine, Asimov's SF Adventure Magazine, targeted to a younger audience. The first issue was dated Fall 1978.  Four quarterly issues appeared, but sales were weak, and a planned fifth issue never appeared.  Davis also began planning to acquire Analog from Condé Nast. This took longer to achieve, but in early 1980 the deal was completed, and Analog and Asimov's become stable-mates at Davis Publications.

Davis moved all four of his fiction magazines to a four-weekly schedule in 1981, meaning there were thirteen issues per year.  The change took effect at Asimov's with the January issue, which was dated January 19, 1981.  Later that year Davis launched two more fiction magazines: Crime Digest and Science Fiction Digest; these carried book excerpts and publishing news.  Scithers had been announced as the editor, but when it was launched Shawna McCarthy was given the editorial role, perhaps because Scithers was based in Philadelphia, with a local team of first readers to help read the incoming manuscripts, and Davis wanted an editor who was in the New York office five days a week.  According to Asimov, Scithers and Davis never got along very well.  Scithers' refusal to move to New York made matters worse, and there were other sources of tension: Davis appointed Carol Gross as executive director in charge of marketing and production, and Gross instigated a redesign of the magazine and took control of the art department away from Scithers.  In December 1981, Scithers was fired.

Scithers' replacement was Kathleen Moloney, who was hired away from Bantam where she had been a book editor.  Moloney had no experience with magazine editing, and relied on McCarthy for much of the editorial work.  At first Moloney edited the stories heavily without consulting the authors until the galley proofs were printed, against McCarthy's advice.  After pushback from the authors Moloney turned over manuscript editing to McCarthy.  Moloney was hired away by Times Books later that year, and replaced by McCarthy, who was told that Asimov had insisted that she become the next editor if the magazine wanted to keep his name.  Her first issue was dated January 1983.  She was succeeded in May 1985 by Gardner Dozois, though he was not credited on the masthead until January 1986.

Circulation had declined from its first-year peak to about 80,000 by the time Dozois became editor. The 1987 recession caused Davis Publications financial problems, and Davis decide to sell all four fiction magazines. While Davis searched for a buyer, changes were made to increase profitability: two issues per year were doubled in size and increased in price. The magazines were bought in January 1992 by Bantam-Doubleday-Dell, and became part of Dell Magazines. The title was shortened that November to Asimov's Science Fiction. In September 1996 Dell Magazines was sold to Penny Press. The schedule returned to monthly, eliminating the thirteenth issue each year, and the October and November issues were combined, so that only eleven issues appeared per year. The page count was cut, and prices increased. The page count dropped at the same time, but the changes were announced as an increase in total text of 10%, with no price increase. However, a year later the price did rise again. Circulation dropped over 30% over the first four years of Penny Press's ownership, from about 46,000 to under 32,000, probably partly because of these changes. Most of the decline was in subscription sales, though profitability was helped by subscribers who came through the magazine's website, which had been started in 1998. According to Sheila Williams, then an editor at Penny Press, these subscriptions were valuable because "they came direct to the publisher instead of going through a middleman. They didn't increase the number of subscribers, but they were very good for the bottom line".

Dozois gave up the editorship in 2004, and was succeeded by Williams, whose first issue was dated December of that year.  The number of issues per year was reduced to ten starting in 2004, with the April and May issues combined into a double-sized issue.  From January 2017, the schedule was changed to six bimonthly double-sized issues per year.

Contents and reception

Scithers 

Asimov and Scithers agreed at the launch of the magazine on their goals for the magazine.  In an editorial in the first issue, Asimov said "...we will lean toward hard science fiction, and toward the reasonably straightforward in the way of style...We will have humorous stories and we will have an occasional unclassifiable story".  The first issue included stories by Asimov, Arthur C. Clarke, Jonathan Fast, and Fred Saberhagen, and an excerpt from Gordon R. Dickson's novel Time Storm which would be published later that year.  John Varley contributed two stories: "Good-Bye, Robinson Crusoe", one of his Eight Worlds stories; and (under a pseudonym) "Air Raid", which was later turned into a film, Millennium.  Asimov's soon became known for humorous stories; the only touch of humor in the first issue was Clarke's story, "Quarantine", which was a very short story originally written to fit on a postcard, and more quickly appeared.  Two stories by Asimov based on puns appeared in the second issue, and the third issue saw the re-appearance of Reginald Bretnor's "Feghoot" series of punning stories that had appeared in The Magazine of Fantasy & Science Fiction and Venture Science Fiction decades earlier.  More "spoofs and parodies and occasional limericks" appeared, and science fiction historian Mike Ashley comments that they "threatened to overshadow the more serious fiction".  For example "Bat Durston: Space Marshal" by G. Richard Bozarth was a parody, inspired by an advertisement that had appeared on the back cover of Galaxy Science Fiction in the 1950s; Ashley points out that new readers might have thought it was intended as a serious story.  Allied with some stories clearly written for younger readers, these stories gave the impression that the magazine was targeted at a juvenile audience.  Orson Scott Card commented in an early review of Asimov's that it had "tapped a juvenile market that none of the other magazines was reaching", and other reviewers made similar comments.  As a result some writers did not submit manuscripts to Asimov's despite the competitive rates of pay.

Scithers bought the first published story of many writers over his tenure, and his habit of announcing in the magazine when a story was a first sale may have encouraged more submissions from new writers.  His discoveries included Barry Longyear and Diana Paxson, and several more authors who had only just started their careers began selling regularly to Scithers, including John M. Ford, Nancy Kress, and Somtow Sucharitkul.  Longyear's "Circus World" series began in the magazine, but his best-received story was "Enemy Mine", which appeared in the September 1979 issue and won both the Hugo and Nebula Awards.  Some well-established writers appeared in the magazine, despite its reputation as juvenile market: Varley contributed "The Barbie Murders" in early 1978, and Michael Bishop, Brian Aldiss, Tanith Lee, Robert Silverberg, Gene Wolfe, and James Tiptree, Jr, all appeared during Scither's tenure.

Asimov's readership included many readers who were new to the field, and many more who had given up on the other major science fiction magazines. This combination was a good fit for Scithers' approach: traditional stories, without sex, or four-letter words: nothing "challenging or revolutionary".  Some older writers such as L. Sprague de Camp, Hal Clement, and Jack Williamson fit in well with Scithers' constraints, producing material that would have fit in a 1950s magazine, but this was not always the case.  Stories by Frederik Pohl (later assembled as The Cool War) appeared in 1979, and letters poured in objecting to the language.  Scithers responded: "...we want to apologize for not copy-editing this instalment as well as we should.  It's not our intention to use language quite that strong when we (and the authors) can avoid doing so".  Evidence from circulation figures suggest that longtime readers of science fiction were becoming a smaller percentage of Asimov's readership, and Ashley describes the result as stagnation: Scithers' had "dumbed down" the material to please the new readers Asimov's was attracting, but as a result the magazine was becoming isolated within the field.  John Shirley criticized the magazine in 1979 as "a fog of predictability, formula, and done-to-death techno-bullshit imagery",  adding a year later that Scithers was playing it safe, "And when you're that safe, you're schlock...People think that this is science fiction and I fear that it is a major neutralizing influence on the field."  Ashley argues that the magazine's success cannot be ascribed only to the unchallenging fiction it printed; Asimov's name drew in many fans of his books, and Davis Publications' marketing experience helped as well.

Moloney 
Moloney had no background in science fiction, but soon realized that Asimov's name was a significant asset.  She persuaded Asimov to submit his Azazel stories, which he had begun publishing in the competing magazines, to Asimov's, starting with "To the Victor" in July 1982.  Moloney added two non-fiction columns: a profile of a writer, often written by Charles Platt, and an opinion column called Viewpoint.  A cartoon series, "Mooney's Module", began, and she commissioned crosswords from Merl Reagle.  Reader reaction was mixed, with some letters complaining about the non-fiction columns taking up space that could have been used for another story.  Her impact on the fiction was limited; author reaction to her habit of heavily editing their manuscripts, and advice from McCarthy, led to her giving McCarthy a good deal of control over the fiction.  Two well-known stories published during Moloney's tenure were Connie Willis's "A Letter from the Clearys", and David Brin's "The Postman", which later formed the basis of a novel and film of the same name.

McCarthy 
McCarthy took over fully as editor with Moloney's departure at the end of 1982.  February 1983, the second issue with McCarthy's name on the masthead, included Greg Bear's novella "Hardfought", which went on to win the Nebula Award.  McCarthy was willing to expand the range of fiction the magazine published, and most readers who wrote in agreed that the prohibition on sex and violence could be relaxed, but Davis Publications did not waiting to risk alienating the young readers which they knew formed part of the magazine's audience.  McCarthy was unable to resolve this conflict for Connie Willis's "All My Darling Daughters", a story featuring "lesbianism and bestiality and incest", in Willis's words, and it never saw print in Asimov's, appearing in Willis's short story collection Fire Watch instead.  McCarthy continued to be open to a broader range of fiction than Scithers had been, and at the end of the year published Leigh Kennedy's "Her Furry Face", with a plot that involved sex with an intelligent orangutan.  Two stories in the next issue featuring street violence: Norman Spinrad's "Street Meat", and Octavia Butler's "Speech Sounds", and McCarthy introduced "Street Meat" by saying "What follows is not for the faint of heart".  Kennedy's story led to many complaints and cancelled subscriptions, and McCarthy was asked by Davis to be cautious in future, but the stories were well-received: "Speech Sounds" won that year's short story Hugo Award, and "Her Furry Face" was nominated for the Nebula Award.  Asimov defended the publication of "Her Furry Face" in a subsequent editorial.  McCarthy commented afterwards that "the long-time Asimov fans were shocked and we hadn't gotten enough new readers yet".  Other stories from McCarthy's first year in charge included Dozois's "The Peacemaker", in the August 1983 issue, which won the Nebula Award.

Well-received stories from 1984, McCarthy's second year in charge, included Lucius Shepard's "A Traveler's Tale", John Kessel's "The Big Dream", and Varley's "Press Enter■", which won both the Hugo and Nebula Awards.  Ashley singles out Octavia Butler's "Bloodchild", in the June 1984 issue, as "arguably the single most important story publiished during McCarthy's editorship".  The story was about a race of insectoid aliens.  The human protagonist has a relationship with one of the aliens, and agrees to allow the alien to lay their eggs in his body.  "Bloodchild" won the Hugo and Nebula Awards and appeared in all that year's "Best of" anthologies.  Reader reaction in Asimov's was positive, and a 1995 review of Butler's collection Bloodchild and Other Stories described it as "one of the genre's undisputed classics".

McCarthy's effect on the magazine was quickly noticed.  Dozois's summary of 1983 in science fiction commented that "If there was an award for the most dramatically improved magazine of the year, it would have to go to Isaac Asimov's Science Fiction Magazine, and the credit for that sea change seems to bel+ong almost entirely to new editor Shawna McCarthy".  Writers began to make Asimov's their first market to submit to, and 1985 saw more award-winning stories as a result: Pohl's "Fermi and Frost"; Silverberg's "Sailing to Byzantium"; Roger Zelazny's "24 Views of Mount Fuji, by Hokusai"; and "Portraits of His Children", by George R. R. Martin.  For the three years that McCarthy edited, Asimov's dominated the annual science fiction awards, accounting for almost a third of the nominations for Hugo, Nebula, and Locus Awards, and inclusions in the annual "Year's Best" anthologies.

McCarthy also discovered or encouraged many new writers, including Mary Gentle, Nina Kiriki Hoffman, Paul J. McAuley, and Karen Joy Fowler.

Dozois 
When Dozois took over the editorship of Asimov's, McCarthy's work had changed the image of the magazine, and Dozois worked to solidify the impression that "Asimov's was where the 'Cutting Edge' work in the field was appearing, so that authors would be eager to appear there".  Dozois tenure began as cyberpunk (a subgenre of science fiction focused on the consequences of virtual reality and computer technology) was becoming more popular, and cyberpunk fiction appeared early in Dozois's tenure: in  January 1986, Dozois serialized William Gibson's Count Zero, the sequel to Gibson's debut novel, Neuromancer, and he also printed Pat Cadigan's "Pretty Boy Crossover".  Asimov's did not focus solely on cyberpunk, though; Dozois printed a wide variety of speculative fiction.  Stories from Dozois's first year include Lucius Shepard's "R&R", which won the Nebula; Orson Scott Card's "Hatrack River", which won the World Fantasy Award; and Kate Wilhelm's "The Girl Who Fell From the Sky", which won a Nebula.  Pat Murphy and Kim Stanley Robinson began selling regularly to Dozois; Murphy's "Rachel in Love", in the April 1987 issue, about little girl's personality in a chimpanzee's body, won a Nebula and a Locus Award, and Robinson's "The Blind Geometer", about a blind mathematician, in the August issue, also won a Nebula.

Asimov's had never run serials before Count Zero, and there was some resistance from the readers, since in most cases the novel would also be published in book form.  Dozois persisted for a while, with Michael Swanwick's Vacuum Flowers beginning serialization in the Mid-December 1986 issue.  Harlan Ellison's script for a film based on Asimov's robot short stories was serialized at the end of 1987 as I Robot: The Movie, and Swanwick's Stations of the Tide ran in the Mid-December 1990 and January 1991 issues, but those were the last to appear.

A regular feature of the magazine was a long novella as the lead story.  Orson Scott Card's "Eye for Eye", which won a Hugo, appeared in this slot, as did Megan Lindholm's "A Touch of Lavender", voted the most popular novella of 1989 by Asimov's readers.  Dozois also published shorter fiction, including Suzy McKee Charnas's "Boobs".  Allen Steele and Mary Rosenblum were two of Dozois's discoveries, but overall the number of new writers appearing in the magazine fell.  Ashley suggests this was because the magazine's reputation was now high, and Dozois received hundreds of manuscripts a week, making it harder for new authors to break through.

Dozois won the Hugo Award for best professional editor every year from 1988 to 2004 with only two exceptions, in 1994 and 2002.

Williams 
In Williams' first editorial, in the January 2005 issue, she made it clear she did not plan to make dramatic changes to the approach established by McCarthy and Dozois.  Williams reinstated the letter column, and began an intermittent non-fiction column, "Thought Experiments", starting with a reminiscence by Roger Ebert of his involvement in science fiction fandom.  She won the Hugo Award for short-form editor in 2011 and 2012.

Martin Gardner wrote a regular column of "puzzle tales" for the magazine from 1977 to 1986. He produced 111 columns in all, many later published in book form.

Other authors published in Asimov's Science Fiction 

Paolo Bacigalupi
Stephen Baxter
Elizabeth Bear
M. Shayne Bell
Gregory Benford
Damien Broderick
John Brunner
Greg Egan
Suzette Haden Elgin
Joe Haldeman
James Patrick Kelly
Mary Robinette Kowal
Ursula K. Le Guin
Jonathan Lethem
Kelly Link
Ian R. MacLeod
Robert Reed
Mike Resnick
Joel Rosenberg
Kristine Kathryn Rusch
Brian Stableford
Bruce Sterling
Charles Stross
Harry Turtledove

Bibliographical details 
The editorial succession at Asimov's is as follows:
 George H. Scithers, Spring 1977–February 15, 1982
 Kathleen Moloney, March 15, 1982–Mid-December 1982
 Shawna McCarthy, January 1983–December 1985
 Gardner Dozois, January 1986–October/November 2004
 Sheila Williams, December 2004–present as of January 2023

Scithers won two Hugo awards as best editor, and was succeeded by Shawna McCarthy.  McCarthy won one Hugo award.  Gardner Dozois won 15 Hugo awards, before stepping down and becoming its contributing editor.  Sheila Williams is the current editor and won the Hugo Awards for Best Short Form Editor in 2011.

Asimov's Science Fiction celebrated its thirtieth anniversary in 2007, with an anthology edited by the magazine's current editor, Sheila Williams. Drawing on stories published from 1977 to the present day, it was published by Tachyon Publications.

Notes

References

Sources

External links 
 Asimov's Science Fiction (official web site)
 A Brief History of Asimov's Science Fiction Magazine
 Wood TV 8 report
 Response to News 8 (from the magazine)

1977 establishments in the United States
Science fiction magazines published in the United States
Monthly magazines published in the United States
Isaac Asimov
Magazines established in 1977
Science fiction digests
Science fiction magazines established in the 1970s
Magazines published in Connecticut
Penny Publications magazines